Rashvan (also Romanized as Rashvān) is a village in Raviz Rural District, Koshkuiyeh District, Rafsanjan County, Kerman Province, Iran. At the 2006 census, its population was 40, in 12 families.

See also 
 Rashwan, Egyptian surname

References 

Populated places in Rafsanjan County